Special Delivery is a 2022 South Korean crime action film, written and directed by Park Dae-min for M Pictures. Starring Park So-dam, Song Sae-byeok and Kim Eui-sung, the film revolves around a delivery driver (Park So-dam) with a 100% success rate, things start happening when she is involved in an unexpected incident after a young child (Jung Hyeon-jun) boards into her car. It was theatrical released on January 12, 2022. 

The film was officially invited in Harbour section at the 51st International Film Festival Rotterdam held from January 26 to February 6, 2022. On box office, it earned a gross of US$3.46 million and garnered 439,177 admissions.

Synopsis 
Eun-ha is a delivery clerk with a 100% track record of delivering unusual items. One day, Eun-ha leaves for Seoul to pick up a client, who is involved in the city's gambling trade, but she meets the client's son Kim Seo-wan at the pick-up point. Meanwhile, Kyeong-pil, a police officer and the mastermind behind the gambling trade, chases after Seo-wan to retrieve a security key to the bank account that holds 30 million, which is in his possession. The rest of the story revolves around how Eun-Ha protects Seo-wan from Kyeong-pil.

Cast
 Park So-dam as Jang Eun-ha, a delivery driver
 Song Sae-byeok as Jo Kyung-pil, an investigator chasing after Eun-ha.
 Kim Eui-sung as Baek Kang-cheol, president of Baekgang Industries, a special delivery company
 Jung Hyeon-jun as Kim Seo-won
 Yeon Woo-jin as Kim Doo-shik, a special client, father of Seo-won
 Yeom Hye-ran as Han Mi-Young, pursuer of Eun-ha from the National Intelligence Service
 Han Hyun-min as Asif, express vehicle repair expert

Special appearance
 Yoo Seung-ho
 Jeon Seok-ho
 Choi Deok-moon

Production
Production began on May 29, 2019 with Park So-dam, Song Sae-byeok, Kim Eui-sung and Jung Hyeon-jun confirmed as cast. Park Dae-min was confirmed as director of the crime action film. Park So-dam and  Jung Hyeon-jun are working together after 2019 film Parasite. Yeon Woo-jin, Yeom Hye-ran and Han Hyun-min joined the cast in supporting roles. Principal photography began on May 29, 2019 for this chase film. Script reading photos were revealed on June 4.

Music
Original soundtrack of the film was released on January 5, 2022. This is third venture of music director Hwang Sang-joon, for director Park Dae-min after Private Eye (2009) and Seondal: The Man Who Sells the River (2016). The music has been appreciated by the audience who watched the preview.

Original soundtrack

Release
The film was scheduled for theatrical release on January 5, 2022, but the date was pushed to a week later to January 12. The film was officially invited in the Harbour section at the 51st International Film Festival Rotterdam, which was held from January 26 to February 6, 2022, and in the competition section at the 24th Udine Far East Film Festival held from April 22 to April 30, 2022. Additionally, it was pre-sold to 47 countries around the world. After its release on January 12 in South Korea, it released in Hong Kong, Singapore and Mongolia on 13 and 14 January, and in Indonesia and Taiwan on 19 and 28 January respectively. It was also invited to the 26th Fantasia International Film Festival and was screened for its North American premiere on July 14, 2022.

The film entered the thriller competition section of the 40th Brussels International Fantastic Film Festival and was screened for Belgian premiere on September 6, 2022.

Home media
The film was made available for streaming on IPTV (Olleh TV, B TV, LG U+ TV), Home Choice, TVING, Naver TV, WAVVE, Google Play, KT skylife, Cinefox and KakaoPage from February 4, 2022.

Reception

Box office
The film was released on 995 screens on January 12, 2021. As per Korean Film Council (Kofic) integrated computer network, the film with 233,462 admissions ranked no. 2 on the Korean box office on opening weekend.

, it grossed US$3.25 million along with 443,177 admissions.

Critical response
Baek Seung-chan of Kyunghyang Shinmun appreciated the performances of Park So-dam and Song Sae-byeok. Comparing the film with the American films Baby Driver (2017) and Drive (2011), Baek stated that the film is fun, and "the scene design that takes advantage of the cultural characteristics of Korea is interesting". However he was critical of the way the film treated children. Concluding he wrote, "Special Delivery easily utilizes the plight of the socially disadvantaged and children as a combination suitable for genre films."

Accolades

References

External links
 
 
 
 
 Special Delivery on KOFIC (in Korean)

2022 films
2020s South Korean films
2020s Korean-language films
Films postponed due to the COVID-19 pandemic
South Korean chase films
South Korean crime action films
Films about the National Intelligence Service (South Korea)
Films about police corruption
Films set in Busan
Films set in Gyeonggi Province
Films set in Seoul
Next Entertainment World films
Films about North Korean defectors
2022 crime action films